Pedro Quartucci (July 30, 1905 in Buenos Aires – April 20, 1983 in Buenos Aires) was an Argentine boxer and actor.

Boxing career
As a featherweight professional boxer who competed in the 1920s, he won a bronze medal in Boxing at the 1924 Summer Olympics in the featherweight division, losing against Joseph Salas in the semi-final.

Acting career
He then pursued an acting career and appeared in dozens of Argentine films and television series from 1931 until 1980. He appeared in films such as Al marido hay que seguirlo in (1948). He died of a heart attack in 1983.

Selected filmography
 Luces de Buenos Aires (1931)
 Dancing (1933)
 The Favorite (1935)
 Goal (1936)
 Palermo (1937)
Melodies of America (1941)
 Girls Orchestra (1941)
 The New Bell (1950)
 The Honourable Tenant (1951)

External links
 Entry at databaseolympics.com

 Filmography and photo at cinenational.com

References

External links

Olympic boxers of Argentina
Featherweight boxers
Olympic bronze medalists for Argentina
Boxers at the 1924 Summer Olympics
1905 births
1983 deaths
Male actors from Buenos Aires
Boxers from Buenos Aires
Argentine people of Italian descent
Argentine male film actors
Argentine male television actors
Olympic medalists in boxing
Burials at La Chacarita Cemetery
20th-century Argentine male actors
Argentine male boxers
Medalists at the 1924 Summer Olympics